Center of the United States may refer to:

 Geographic center of the United States
 Mean center of the United States population
 Median center of United States population